Grand Preceptor, also referred to as Grand Master, was the senior-most of the top three civil positions of the Chinese Zhou dynasty. The other two were Grand Tutor (太傅) and Grand Protector (太保), respectively. These three posts were the first posts to be known as the Three Excellencies. The position titles and duties of the Three Excellencies changed in later dynasties. The title of Grand Preceptor continued to be used during the later parts of the Han dynasty, notably by Dong Zhuo, then Chancellor of State.

It was also used by the Northern Yuan as a title for powerful nobles who were not part of the Chinggisid lineage.

The rank was imitated in the Confucian structure of the Vietnamese court, where the same Chinese title in Vietnamese pronunciation was known as thái sư.

References 

Taishi
Government of Imperial China
Zhou dynasty